Hilleh Historical Village is a special sub-ground historical village in Osku County, Iran near to Osku in the vicinity of Kandovan, Osku. Currently nobody lives there. It is claimed it was built before the Islamic period. It was destroyed during Mongol attack on Iran. The entire houses remain. Different parts of the houses like kitchens, and special places for animals inside the houses can be seen.

Excavation operations are going on by the government to find out more about the villages.

Archaeological sites in Iran
Buildings and structures in East Azerbaijan Province
Former populated places in Iran